The Mexican 20-peso note is the smallest denomination in circulation of Mexican currency, but the most commonly used in Mexico, other than the 1,000-peso note that is normally only used for high-value transactions.

The 20 pesos banknote has in the obverse side a portrait of Benito Juárez, twenty-sixth president of the Mexican Republic who fought in the Reform War. He declared a constitution and promoted education. It also has a balance that represents the people and justice above the law reform and the bird.

On the reverse side is an image of Monte Alban, located in the state of Oaxaca. Below it is the symbol of cojijo, and finally the mark of the Bank of Mexico.

Security Measures

Touch sensitive Reliefs 

In some areas, the surface of the bill has a small touch-sensitive relief, especially if they are very new. The areas where they feel are: Legend of Bank of Mexico, the Law Refornm, in the 45th degree rotated says 20 pesos and below the transparent part of the printing Ave.

Texts microprinted

The micro-printed texts are small texts, it is necessary to use glasses or lenses to be observed. On the obverse tickets are 20 pesos microprinted text in various parts of the body ticket "20 pesos". Butterfly below reads letters of decreasing height: "Among individuals as among nations respect the rights of others is peace", which is a very famous phrase of Benito Juarez.

Parties change colors 

A special ink that changes color depending on the level of light is used, which is in the left wing of the bird and the symbol that is above the transparent window. It may be noted to rotate and tilt the ticket.

Hilo microprinted 

This wire is part of the polymer from which the ticket is made. The existence of such tests involve passing the thread in a banknote ultraviolet lamp inside which the ticket show small luminescent threads. The thread says "20 pesos"

Linear Funds

On the front and back of the bill is a composite of figures and broad, thin stripes design, which can only be seen with a magnifying glass. As a kind of irregular Skin

Perfect Record

In the right corner is the map of Mexico incomplete but direct light map is fully and equally for the compass.

Watermark 

Security is another brand that just, it is already done in the polymer is to direct light. In this case, the image is observed Juarez gray.

Transparent Window 

It is a small transparent window in the lower corner that says 20 pesos.

History 
The bills that preceded it were the type D and D1.

Type D 

In the Salinas government, off the zeros, making the new type D tickets that were very useful, but really not as cheap as they were made of cotton were the Chamber to Juarez and Juarez eagle.

Type D1 

As the Bank did not suit him use cotton as a low-denomination banknote he decided to do it this time and had a polymer similar to the previous design, not like other bills like Mexico fifty-peso bill or Mexico One hundred-peso bill.

History of Character: Benito Juarez 

Benito Pablo Juarez Garcia (San Pablo Guelatao, Oaxaca, March 21, 1806 - Mexico City, July 18, 1872) was a Mexican lawyer and politician, Zapotec Indian origin, president of Mexico repeatedly December 18, 1857 to 18 July 1872. You will be known as the "Father of the Americas" 3 is celebrated her sentence "Among individuals, as among nations, respect for the rights of others is peace" .

Benito Juárez lived one of the most important times of Mexico, considered by many historians as the consolidation of the nation as a republic. Juarez marked a turning point in national history, being first rate protagonist of this era. His biography in the years he held the presidency is almost entirely also the history of Mexico.

See also 

 Mexican Peso

References

Peso
Twenty-base-unit banknotes
Banknotes of Mexico
Benito Juárez